The 2006–07 season was Blackpool F.C.'s 99th season (96th consecutive) in the Football League. It was also their fifth consecutive season in the third tier of English football. They finished third, and were promoted via the play-offs to The Championship.

Andy Morrell was the club's top scorer, with twenty goals (sixteen in the league, three in the FA Cup and one in the League Trophy).

It was Simon Grayson's first full season as manager.

Season Review

2006
Blackpool's league season began on 5 August 2006, with a long trip to Brentford. Olafur Ingi Skulason's 74th-minute strike — what turned out to be his only goal of the season — gave all three points to the hosts.

Three days later, Blackpool faced Nottingham Forest in an evening game at Bloomfield Road. A double from Forest's Jack Lester, one in either half, sealed a win for the visitors.

Another home game followed on 12 August, against Rotherham United. A single goal, scored by Will Hoskins in the 78th minute, gave the U's the points, and left Blackpool without a point from a possible nine.

Blackpool's second away game, at Bristol City on 19 August, provided them with their first win. Goals from Scott Vernon (27'), Michael Jackson (50'), Keigan Parker (77') and Danny Graham (89') gave the Tangerines a 4–2 victory.

League Cup duties began on 22 August, and Barnsley travelled to the Fylde Coast for what turned out to be a long affair. The score was tied 1–1 at the end of normal time, Scott Vernon's 70th-minute goal cancelling out Robbie Williams' earlier penalty. The match went to extra time, during which each side scored one more goal — Vernon, in the final minute, again equalising proceedings. To penalties it went, and Barnsley came out on top 4–2.

Focus returned to the league, and on 26 August Gillingham were the visitors to Bloomfield Road. The Gills took the lead after just three minutes, through Guylain Ndumbu-Nsungu. Scott Vernon again came to the Seasiders' rescue with a goal, scored ten minutes before the break, and 1–1 was how the scoreline remained.

Into September, and Blackpool travelled to the New Den to face Millwall on the second of the month and returned with another point in a goalless draw.

Another away game a week later saw the Tangerines return empty-handed from Port Vale. Keith Southern's last-minute goal halving Vale's lead established by Leon Constantine and Akpo Sodje.

Blackpool welcomed Chesterfield to town on 12 September. Simon Gillett, who arrived at the club the previous month on a three-month loan from Southampton, opened the scoring after 33 minutes; however, Kevan Hurst equalised on the hour-mark, and the game finished 1–1.

Oldham were the next visitors to Bloomfield Road, on 16 September, and held Blackpool to their fourth stalemate in five games. Scott Vernon opened the scoring four minutes before half time. The score was brought level twenty minutes after the interval by former Blackpool midfielder Richie Wellens. Oldham then took the lead on 72 minutes through Chris Porter, but substitute Andy Morrell saved the home side's blushes with an equaliser in injury time.

For their tenth league game, on 23 September, Blackpool returned to the road and travelled to South Yorkshire to face Doncaster Rovers. They kept a clean sheet in a goalless draw.

The Seasiders travelled north to Carlisle United the following midweek. Goals from former Blackpool loanee Chris Lumsdon and Karl Hawley gave the Cumbrians victory.

On 30 September, Blackpool faced Leyton Orient at Bloomfield Road. Andy Morrell opened the scoring after 21 minutes, and that's how matters remained for the next hour. On 81 minutes, Orient were reduced to ten men when Adam Tann was sent off. Wes Hoolahan converted the resulting penalty, and Keigan Parker found the net four minutes later for Blackpool's third and final goal.

Blackpool travelled to the south coast on 8 October to face Brighton & Hove Albion, and recorded their second successive win, again by a 3–0 margin. Keith Southern scored his second goal of the season after seventeen minutes, and a double by Scott Vernon (61' and 87'), either side of Alexandre Frutos's dismissal for the home side, sealed the three points for the visitors.

Six days later, Blackpool hosted Yeovil Town. Scott Vernon's 56th-minute opener was equalised by Marcus Stewart four minutes from time.

Crewe Alexandra were the opponents the following weekend, and Blackpool returned to Lancashire the victors after a 2–1 victory over Dario Gradi's men. Andy Morrell's third-minute strike was cancelled out by Nicky Maynard after 67 minutes. Shaun Barker scored the winner in injury time for Blackpool, who had Simon Gillett dismissed ten minutes earlier.

On 28 October, Bradford City were the visitors to Bloomfield Road. David Fox scored the game's first goal after 38 minutes. Wes Hoolahan doubled the lead on the stroke of half-time from the penalty spot. Twenty minutes into the second half, Keigan Parker made it three without reply, and added another six minutes later. The Bantams scored what proved to be a consolation goal six minutes from time, before having Joe Brown sent off in injury time.

Cup action intervened on 31 October, this time the League Trophy, and Blackpool travelled to Accrington Stanley. Simon Gillett opened the scoring just after the half-hour mark, only to see Ian Craney bring Stanley level a minute before the break. Shaun Barker restored the Seasiders' lead on 54 minutes, but this was again cancelled out by Andy Todd five minutes later. The hosts took the lead for the first time, through Paul Mullin, after 64 minutes, but Ben Burgess restored parity with his first goal of the season fifteen minutes from time. Burgess doubled his tally ten minutes later, and Robbie Williams tied the game at 4–4 in injury time. The game went to a penalty shootout, which Stanley won 4–2.

Back in the league, Blackpool travelled to Northampton Town on 4 November. Andy Morrell put the Tangerines ahead after twenty minutes. Blackpool maintained their lead until just after the hour mark, when Eoin Jess pulled the scores level. The match ended 1–1, Blackpool's seventh draw of the league season.

Blackpool's FA Cup campaign began in Huddersfield on 11 November. Wes Hoolahan's 70th-minute penalty was enough to see the Seasiders through to the second round.

Blackpool and Huddersfield met again, this time in the league, seven days later at Bloomfield Road. Keigan Parker (20') and Keith Southern (30') put the hosts 2–0 up, before future 'Pool player Gary Taylor-Fletcher pulled one back for Town on the stroke of half-time. Andy Morrell put the game out of reach for Blackpool on the hour mark. Goalkeeper Paul Rachubka, who was on Huddersfield's bench for both games, joined Blackpool on loan in January.

On 24 November, Simon Grayson's men made the short trip down the coast to face Tranmere Rovers. Former Blackpool loan player Chris Greenacre put Rovers ahead inside two minutes. Steve Davies extended the lead on 67 minutes, and Blackpool's seven-game unbeaten league run was ended.

The FA Cup intervened again on 2 December, and Blackpool travelled to face MK Dons for their second-round tie. Keigan Parker put Blackpool ahead after half an hour, and Andy Morrell doubled their lead just after the break. Blackpool progressed to the third round.

Cheltenham Town were the visitors to Bloomfield Road for a league game on 5 December. Damian Spencer gave Town the lead after thirteen minutes, but Andy Morrell (29') and Wes Hoolahan (80') combined to give the Tangerines all three points.

Four days later, Swansea City travelled to the seaside. Carl Dickinson's 21st-minute own goal gave the Swans the lead. Scott Vernon levelled proceedings with just seven minutes left on the referee's watch.

Blackpool travelled to Scunthorpe United on 15 December, and recorded their second victory in three games. Andy Morrell put Blackpool in the lead just before the half-hour mark; Wes Hoolahan doubled the scoreline from the penalty spot on 58 minutes (fifteen minutes before he was sent off); and Keigan Parker made it three on 88 minutes. Ian Baraclough pulled one back for the Iron in injury time.

The following week saw Blackpool visiting the south coast again, this time to face AFC Bournemouth. After a scoreless first half, Keigan Parker put Blackpool ahead two minutes after the restart. He scored his and the Seasiders' second five minutes later. Bournemouth were reduced to ten men on 69 minutes when Darren Anderton was dismissed. Simon Gillett, who had been on loan to Blackpool the previous month, pulled one back for the home side, but David Fox restored Blackpool's two-goal lead two minutes from time.

Blackpool began the second half of the league season with a Boxing Day home game against Carlisle. An own goal by the visitors' Peter Murphy after five minutes gave the Seasiders the lead. Keigan Parker added a second on 29 minutes. Karl Hawley scored a consolation goal for Carlisle seventeen minutes from time.

2006 was closed out with a home game against Doncaster Rovers on 30 December. Scott Vernon (77') put the hosts ahead ten minutes after coming on as a substitute, and his goal was followed in quick succession by Shaun Barker ('81) and one more from himself ('83). Paul Heffernan pulled one back for Rovers in injury time.

Simon Grayson was named League One Manager of the Month for December.

2007
The calendar was turned with a trip to Chesterfield on New Year's Day. A 2–0 defeat ensued, Blackpool's first loss in seven games.

Focus turned to the FA Cup again on 6 January, with Aldershot visiting Bloomfield Road for the first time in fifteen years. Scott Vernon found the net after just four minutes. This was followed three minutes later by an Andy Morrell strike. John Grant netted for Aldershot just before the half-hour mark, and the score remained 2–1 at half-time. Morrell scored his second and Blackpool's third on 73 minutes, and Ben Burgess made it four with ten minutes remaining. Mark Pritchard scored a second for the visitors, but the game ended 4–2, and Blackpool had made it to the fourth round for the first time in seventeen years.

Back in League One, Port Vale were the Seasiders' opposition at Bloomfield Road on 13 January. All three goals in the game came in the final eighteen minutes. Andy Morrell put the Tangerines in front after 72 minutes, and David Fox followed his lead four minutes later. Akpo Sodje halved Vale's deficit from the penalty spot in injury time, but the visitors couldn't muster an equaliser and Blackpool bagged the points.

Blackpool travelled to London seven days later to face Leyton Orient. Keith Southern's 85th-minute goal gave the Seasiders the victory.

On 27 January, Norwich City were Blackpool's opponents in the fourth round of the FA Cup. A full house at Bloomfield Road looked on as Darren Huckerby put the Canaries ahead in the dying seconds of the first half. Ian Evatt levelled the score seven minutes after the interval. Norwich had Chris Brown sent off eight minutes from time, but they held on for a replay at Carrow Road.

For their sixth home date in eight games, Blackpool faced Brentford on 3 February. The Bees went three goals ahead in the first half hour, and Blackpool did not reply until Scott Vernon's injury-time strike.

For their FA Cup fourth-round replay ten days later, 'Pool travelled to Norwich. Michael Jackson put the visitors ahead with just under ten minutes of the first half remaining. That goal separated the teams for  the next forty minutes, until Darren Huckerby evened things up. The score remained 1–1 at full-time, and the match went into extra time. Five minutes into extra time, Huckerby scored his second goal of the game and the third of the tie. Shaun Barker levelled matters again just over ten minutes later, but Chris Martin hit what proved to be the winner with eight minutes remaining, putting Norwich through to face Chelsea in the next round.

With just the league to focus on, Blackpool met Bristol City at Bloomfield Road on 17 February, and Wayne Andrews' strike ten minutes into the second half was enough to give the Robins the points.

On 20 February, Blackpool travelled to Nottingham Forest. Junior Agogo put Colin Calderwood's men ahead after sixteen minutes, and that's how it remained until Wes Hoolahan, Blackpool's resident penalty-taker, equalised with an injury-time spot-kick.

Millwall made a trip to the seaside on 24 February, and they returned to London with all three points thanks to Dave Brammer's strike just shy of the thirty-minute mark.

Oldham hosted Blackpool on 27 February, with three former Seasiders players in their team (Les Pogliacomi, Richie Wellens and Paul Edwards). A single goal, scored by Andy Morrell after 67 minutes, resulted in a Blackpool victory.

Into March, Blackpool travelled to Gillingham on the third of the month. Dean McDonald put the home side ahead inside the first ten minutes, only to see Ben Burgess level the score three minutes later. Andrew Crofts (34') struck to put the Gills ahead at the interval. David Fox scored the game's fourth goal just under twenty minutes into the second half, and the game ended 2–2.

AFC Bournemouth made the long midweek trip to Lancashire on 6 March. Adrian Forbes opened his league account with a goal on 36 minutes. This was doubled ten minutes into the second half by Ben Burgess, with his second goal in as many games.

Another south-coast club, this time Brighton & Hove Albion, were the visitors to Bloomfield Road four days later, and they returned to East Sussex with a point after a goalless draw.

On 17 March, Blackpool faced Yeovil Town at Huish Park. Andy Morrell put Blackpool ahead after 56 minutes, and they held on for the win despite having Shaun Barker sent off two minutes later.

Bradford City were the Seasiders' opponents on 24 March. Robbie Williams, who joined Blackpool on loan from Barnsley two days earlier, opened the scoring on six minutes. A second goal did not arrive until the 77th minute, and it was Andy Morrell who doubled Blackpool's lead. Omar Daley pulled one back for the Bantams, but they were reduced to ten men when Steven Schumacher was dismissed eight minutes later. Scott Vernon sealed the game for Blackpool with a third goal, in injury time.

Rotherham United, then bottom of the table, hosted the Tangerines on 27 March, and Chris O'Grady's strike on the hour mark was enough to seal the points for the Millers.

On 31 March, Blackpool welcomed Crewe Alexandra to Bloomfield Road. Wes Hoolahan put the home side ahead after fourteen minutes. Robbie Williams added a second just short of an hour. Shaun Miller scored an injury-time consolation for the Railwaymen.

Tranmere Rovers made the short trip up the coast from the Wirral on 7 April. Keigan Parker put the Tangerines ahead after eight minutes, a lead which lasted twenty minutes — Calvin Zola scoring; however, Wes Hoolahan restored Blackpool's lead nine minutes before half-time. Zola equalised for a second time one minute after the break, but Andy Morrell scored what proved to be the winner on 73 minutes. Rovers had John Mullin and Jason McAteer dismissed on 52 and 53 minutes, respectively.

Blackpool met Huddersfield Town for the third time this season, at the Galpharm Stadium on 9 April. Claus Bech Jørgensen scored his first league goal of the season after 28 minutes to put Blackpool ahead. Robbie Williams doubled the lead after 58 minutes, and the game finished 2–0.

On 14 April, Blackpool faced Northampton Town at Bloomfield Road. Simon Cox gave the visitors the lead at half-time with a strike on 42 minutes. Chris Brandon, who joined Blackpool on loan from Huddersfield the previous month, equalised four minutes after coming on as a half-time substitute. A Wes Hoolahan penalty on 55 minutes put the Seasiders ahead for the first time, and seven minutes later Brandon scored his second and Blackpool's third. A Sean Dyche own goal six minutes from time sealed a 4–1 victory for the hosts.

Blackpool travelled to Cheltenham seven days later. Robbie Williams scored his fourth goal in seven games to give the Seasiders the lead six minutes before half-time. John Finnigan equalised from the penalty spot on 51 minutes, but Keith Southern scored his fifth goal of the season with five minutes remaining to give Blackpool all three points. Blackpool's victory guaranteed them at least a place in the play-offs.

On 28 April, Blackpool hosted Scunthorpe United at Bloomfield Road. Claus Bech Jørgensen opened the scoring after seven minutes in front of a crowd of over 9,000. Keigan Parker scored a second on 26 minutes, and twelve minutes later Chris Brandon was sent off. Billy Sharp halved Scunthorpe's deficit four minutes before half-time. Shaun Barker made it 3–1 on 56 minutes, and ten-man Blackpool held on for the win and moved just two points behind the second automatic-promotion position. Scunthorpe, despite their defeat, were crowned champions.

Simon Grayson was named League One Manager of the Month for April, his second such accolade of the season.

The final game of the regular season occurred on 5 May, with Blackpool's visiting Swansea City. Izzy Iriekpen put the Welsh club ahead on 14 minutes. The lead lasted only eleven minutes, however — Andy Morrell scoring the equaliser. Keigan Parker completed the turnaround just after the half-hour mark, and Blackpool led 2–1 at half-time. Two minutes into the second period, Lee Trundle put the Swans back on level terms. Iriekpen put the home side back in the lead on 55 minutes. Andy Morrell evened matters up again two minutes later, and then put Blackpool ahead on 61 minutes, completing his hat-trick in the process. He scored his fourth and Blackpool's fifth on 78 minutes, and Keigan Parker completed the rout with his second in the final minute. Blackpool won 6–3, and cemented their place in the play-offs with a third-placed finish in the table. The result also ended Swansea's play-off hopes and meant Blackpool finished as the division's top scorers.

Blackpool and Oldham Athletic met in the two-legged semi-finals of the play-offs. Blackpool won both legs — 2–1 at Boundary Park on 13 May and 3–1 at Bloomfield Road six days later.

On 27 May, Blackpool met Yeovil Town in the final at the new Wembley Stadium, taking 28,600 fans to their first appearance at England's national stadium in fifteen years. Blackpool won 2–0, a club-record tenth-consecutive victory, and were promoted to The Championship.

First-team squad

Competitions

Football League One

League table

Results

In summary

By matchday

In detail

Football League One play-offs

Semi-finals

Final

FA Cup

Football League Cup

Football League Trophy

Player statistics

Appearances

Players used: 36

Goals

Total goals scored: 97

Transfers

In

Out

Source

References

Blackpool F.C. seasons
Blackpool